Terrence Ross Jacks (born March 29, 1944) is a Canadian singer, songwriter and record producer, best known for his 1974 hit song "Seasons in the Sun".

Early life

Terry Jacks was born and raised in Winnipeg, Manitoba. His family relocated to Vancouver in the early 1960s. Jacks took up guitar in his teens and at 18 formed a band called The Chessmen with guitarist Guy Sobell. The group had four top-ten hits in Vancouver between 1964 and 1966.

Jacks and the Chessmen performed live on a Friday night in September 1965 for a "Back to School" event at the now-defunct T. Eaton Co. (Eaton's) department store at its Brentwood Mall store in North Burnaby, a municipality next to Vancouver.

Pupils from Burnaby South Senior High School who followed music tuned in to CFUN 1410 AM, which advertised its "Request Line". Being skeptical about whether CFUN really listened to requests, they began phoning the Request Line and asked for the B side of the current Chessmen hit. To their amazement, CFUN began playing it and turned the record into a two-sided hit.

Following The Chessmen, Terry and Susan Pesklevits (Susan Jacks), whom he later married, formed The Poppy Family along with Craig McCaw and Satwant Singh. They had several hits in Canada and internationally, their biggest being "Which Way You Goin' Billy?", which went to #1 in Canada and #2 on the Billboard charts in the U.S. The song was written and produced by Terry Jacks, earning him a Gold Leaf (Juno) award in 1970 for his production. The Poppy Family performed at the Lethbridge, Alberta, Stampede in the summer of 1971.

"Seasons in the Sun"
The song "Seasons in the Sun" was originally intended for the Beach Boys, with Jacks serving as producer for the recording. However, after the group decided not to release it, Jacks decided to record it himself in late 1973 on his own record label, Goldfish Records. It became the largest-selling international single by a Canadian artist at that time, eventually selling 14 million copies worldwide. It earned Jacks two Juno Awards and became one of the biggest-selling Canadian Singles of all time.

The song was based on Rod McKuen's 1965 re-write of "Le moribond", originally by Belgian singer Jacques Brel from 1962. For his version, Jacks made some modifications to the lyrics, which, combined with McKuen's, resulted in a work that bears little resemblance to Brel's original in tone, substance or poetry. In Germany, the UK  and the United States, Jacks' rewrite was released on Bell Records, and the song went to #1 on the charts. In Canada, it was released on Jacks' own label, Goldfish Records, and distributed by London Records Canada.

Jacks later released "If You Go Away" (another McKuen adaptation of a Jacques Brel song, titled "Ne Me Quitte Pas"), which reached #8 in the UK and #24 in Germany, and a cover of Kevin Johnson's "Rock 'N' Roll (I Gave You the Best Years of My Life)", both of which had more success in Canada but also made the Billboard Hot 100 chart in the U.S. He wrote and recorded a number of other songs, and went on to produce for many artists, including "Crazy Talk" and "There's Something I Like About That" for Chilliwack, from their album Riding High.

Jacks produced two songs for Nana Mouskouri: "Scarborough Fair" and "Loving Arms" in 1976. He produced the Vancouver top 10 hit "Country Boy Named Willy" for "SPRING" on London Records (#38 Canada), and Valdy's original version of "Rock and Roll Song" (b/w sometime "Sunday Morning"). The record was scheduled for release on London Records but was re-recorded in Los Angeles with another producer when Valdy signed a recording contract. He also spent a lot of time with Buddy Knox in the 1970s and produced a single for him with two songs: "Me and You" (written by Jacks) and the George Jones song "White Lightnin'"; the single remains unreleased. Jacks also went on to produce a number of other artists in the 1980s and 1990s, including DOA, who recorded a punk rock version of "Where Evil Grows".

2010s
In 2011, Jacks' friend Al Jardine released a new version of "Don't Fight the Sea", recorded along with Beach Boys members Mike Love, Brian Wilson, Bruce Johnston, and the late Carl Wilson, who sang part of the lead vocal. A limited edition white vinyl 45 was made and sold to benefit Japanese tsunami victims.

Jacks released Starfish on the Beach in 2015, a double CD compilation containing 40 of Jacks' favourite tracks from the last 40 years, and features some of his recordings from the 1970s and 1980s. The package contains a 32-page booklet with photographs and Jacks' recollections of his musical career.

Film
Jacks has worked in documentary film and video, producing several shorts on environmental themes including The Faceless Ones, The Tragedy of Clearcutting, The Southern Chilcotin Mountains and The Warmth of Love (The Four Seasons of Sophie Thomas) with cinematographer Ian Hinkle. The video production The Faceless Ones earned an Environmental Gold Award from the New York International Independent Film and Video Festival.

Seasons in the Sun (1986) is a film about the complications created by the arrival of a defecting scientist and a CIA agent intruding on a terminally ill pop-music singer's retirement.

Personal life
In the late 1970s, Jacks gradually withdrew from the music world. He and Susan divorced in 1973. In 1985 he became the father of a daughter. In the 1980s, he became involved in the environmental movement, focusing on pulp mill pollution issues in Canada. His environmental work has earned him several awards including one from the United Nations Association in Canada and the Western Canada Wilderness Committee. He was awarded a lifetime achievement award in 1997 for his work, as well as the Eugene Rogers Environmental Award.

Discography

Studio albums
 Seasons in the Sun (Bell Records) (1974)
 Y' Don't Fight the Sea (Goldfish Records) (1975)
 Pulse (A&M Records) (1983)
 Just Like That (Attic Records) (1987)

Compilation albums
 Into the Past...Terry Jacks Greatest Hits (A&M Records) (1982)
 Singles A's and B's (Goldfish Records) (2004)
 Starfish on the Beach (Regenerator Records) (2015)

Extended plays
 Epocas De Sol (Bell Records) (1974)

Singles

See also
List of 1970s one-hit wonders in the United States
List of musicians from Canada

References

External links
 
 Terry Jacks Biography and Discography on VH1
 Terry Jacks Biography on AOL Music
 Terry Jacks Biography on Yahoo! Music
 Film: The Warmth of Love (The Four Seasons of Sophie Thomas)
 Juno Awards official site
 
 Regenerator Records
 Article at thecanadianencyclopedia.ca

1944 births
Living people
20th-century Canadian guitarists
20th-century Canadian male singers
21st-century Canadian guitarists
21st-century Canadian male singers
Bell Records artists
Canadian environmentalists
Canadian male guitarists
Canadian male singer-songwriters
Canadian pop singers
Columbia Records artists
Juno Award for Artist of the Year winners
Juno Award for Single of the Year winners
Musicians from Winnipeg